The 89th "Oz" Brigade ("Courage" in Hebrew) is a brigade of the Israel Defense Forces (IDF), dedicated entirely to special operations. It was established on December 27, 2015. The new brigade, dubbed the Commando Brigade, is composed solely of infantry special-operations units removed from their previous chain of command structures to create a new tactical formation. Commanded by Aluf Mishne (Colonel) Avi Blut, the brigade operates as part of the 98th Division.

Ideation and development 
According to the IDF, the Commando Brigade is the brainchild of Lieutenant General Gadi Eisenkot and is the implementation of operational lessons learned during Operation Protective Edge in the summer of 2014 and the Second Lebanon War in 2006. According to the 98th Division Commander, the brigade is not only an integration of the elite teams of the Infantry Corps under one command, but also a body expected to lead operational and tactical thinking in order to establish a new warfare doctrine. The new Brigade, furthermore, is intended to provide special operations units a previously lacking centre of gravity.

The concept of a commando brigade was developed by IDF Chief of Staff Gadi Eisenkot during the formulation of the 5-years military plan. The new brigade is said to draw further parallels between Israel's special forces and 75th Ranger Regiment.

Other special-operations units, Sayeret Matkal, Shayetet 13, Shaldag, Oketz and Yahalom will continue to operate independently.

Structure 
The 89th Brigade consists of three (formerly four) special operations units of the IDF: The brigade had a fourth battalion, the now defunct Unit 845, or "Rimon", desert warfare unit, which was absorbed into Maglan on June 27, 2018.

 Unit 212 – Maglan – special reconnaissance unit, formerly under the 98th Division
 Unit 217 – Duvdevan – undercover counter terrorism unit, formerly under Central Command
 Unit 621 – Egoz – guerilla warfare unit, formerly under the Golani Brigade

Commander 
 Brigadier General David Zini (2015–2017)
 Brigadier General Avi Blot (2017–2018)
 Colonel Kobi Heller (2018 –2021)
 Brigadier General Meni Liberty (2021–Present)

Insignia 
The insignia chosen for the new brigade depicts the Hebrew letter Quf (ק), the first letter in the Hebrew word for Commando (קומנדו), composed of a commando knife rising from the sea and a double headed arrow above it. It symbolizes the special designation of the brigade and its mobility, by air, land or sea.

See also 
 Israeli special forces units
 75th Ranger Regiment – the United States Army unit the 89th Brigade approximates to in role

References 

Brigades of Israel
Special forces of Israel
Military units and formations established in 2015